Ceunant Cynfal National Nature Reserve is a river gorge which forms part of a wet wooded ravine of the Afon Cynfal near Ffestiniog in Gwynedd, Wales. The reserve is administered by Natural Resources Wales

References

External links
Llan Ffestiniog, Wales Directory (references Ceunant Cynfal)

National nature reserves in Wales
Nature reserves in Gwynedd
Ffestiniog